David Jonathan Pittu (born April 4, 1967) is an American actor, writer and director.

Early life
Pittu was born and grew up in Fairfield, Connecticut where, as a high school senior, he was a finalist in the NFAA's Arts Recognition Talent Search in Drama. He graduated from New York University 's Tisch School of the Arts in 1989.

Career
Pittu's theater work includes plays and musicals, and he has received two Tony Award nominations. He was nominated for the 2007 Best Featured Actor in a Musical for playing Bertolt Brecht in Harold Prince's LoveMusik  and for the 2008 Best Featured Actor in a Play for his multiple-role turn in the Mark Twain comedy Is He Dead? adapted by David Ives and directed by Michael Blakemore.

He received the Daryl Roth 2010 Creative Spirit Award.

He received the 2009 St. Clair Bayfield Award for his performance in Twelfth Night at the Delacorte Theatre in 2009, directed by Daniel Sullivan. Also under Sullivan's direction, he played Paul Wolfowitz and others, in David Hare's Stuff Happens in 2006 at the Public Theater, which received a Drama Desk Award for Outstanding Ensemble.

He wrote and starred in What's That Smell: The Music of Jacob Sterling, a musical satire about a luckless, eternally "up-and-coming" composer-lyricist. Pittu also wrote the lyrics, with music by Randy Redd to What's That Smell, which premiered Off-Broadway at the 
Atlantic Theater Company in September 2008. The play with music received two Lucille Lortel Award nominations including one for Best Off-Broadway Musical, and was included in both the Entertainment Weekly and The New York Times Top 10 Best Lists in Theater 2008.

Other notable theater work: David Ives' The Heir Apparent (2014 Off-Broadway, CSC, director John Rando); Bill Cain's Equivocation (2010, Off-Broadway Manhattan Theater Club) directed by Garry Hynes; Tom Stoppard's The Coast of Utopia (2006, Broadway, Lincoln Center); Harold Pinter's Celebration and The Room (2005, Off-Broadway, Atlantic Theater Company); and Stephen Sondheim 's Company, part of the Kennedy Center Sondheim Celebration (2002).

His acclaimed performance as Leo Frank in the National Tour of Jason Robert Brown's  Parade, directed by Harold Prince, earned him the 2001 National Broadway Award (Best Actor in a Musical). He appeared in the Encores! staged concert productions Of Thee I Sing (2007, as the French ambassador); Bells Are Ringing (2010, as Sandor); and It's a Bird...It's a Plane...It's Superman (2013, as Dr. Abner Sedgwick).

His film credits include True Story, King Kong and Men in Black 3.  For television he has appeared in House of Cards, PBS' Mercy Street, The Following, The Knick, Damages, The Good Wife, Person of Interest, Fringe, Sex and the City, as well as numerous appearances on all of the Law & Order series.

He is a prolific, award-winning narrator of audio books. He read Donna Tartt 's Pulitzer Prize winner The Goldfinch, which received two "Audie" Awards: Best Literary Fiction and Best Male Solo Performance, 2014.

On August 22, 2002, Pittu was arrested after leaving his twelve-year-old cocker spaniel, Dagmar, in a locked car outside of a ShopRite in Fairfield, Connecticut, during a hot spell. By the time the police arrived and attended to the dog, the temperature in the car was 117 degrees, the dog was panting, and Pittu was arrested.  Police said Pittu later acknowledged that he knew it had been too hot in the car to leave his dog, but they said he showed no remorse for having done so. Pittu was placed on probation.

He lives in New York City and should never be able to have a dog.

Filmography

Film

Television

Videogames

References

External links
 
 
 
American Theatre Wing Biography
David Pittu gets the satirical spotlight in What's That Smell
Actors Words, Writers Voice
Interview
https://www.ctpost.com/news/article/Actor-gets-probation-in-dog-abuse-case-17669776.php

1967 births
American male film actors
American male musical theatre actors
American male television actors
American male voice actors
American people of Romanian descent
Audiobook narrators
Drama Desk Award winners
Living people
Tisch School of the Arts alumni
Male actors from Connecticut
People from Fairfield, Connecticut